Muhammad Ridho Djazulie (born 21 August 1991) is an Indonesian professional footballer who plays as a goalkeeper for Liga 1 club Bali United.

Club career

Persip Pekalongan
Persip Pekalongan recruited Ridho in 2011–12 season, but they loan him to Persekabpur Purworejo. On 19 April 2013, Ridho made his competitive debut for Persip in the 2013 Liga Indonesia Premier Division against PSCS Cilacap, which ended in a 2–0 victory for opponent.

Borneo FC
Ridho in 2018 signed a contract with Borneo to play in Indonesia Soccer Championship A in 2016. He quickly rose as the team's starting goalkeeper, appearing in 53 matches in three seasons Indonesia Soccer Championship A and Liga 1.

Madura United 
On 26 December 2018, Ridho signed for Indonesian Liga 1 club, Madura United. He made his league debut on 17 May 2019 in a match against Persela Lamongan at the Surajaya Stadium, Lamongan.

Bali United 
On 4 May 2022, Ridho was officially introduced as Bali United new player. He made his league debut on 23 August 2022 in a match against Persib Bandung at the Gelora Bandung Lautan Api Stadium, Bandung.

International career
Ridho made his debut for the Indonesia national team in a friendly match against Hong Kong on 16 October 2018.

Career statistics

Club

International

References

External links
 
 

1991 births
Living people
Indonesian footballers
People from Pekalongan
Borneo F.C. players
Madura United F.C. players
Bali United F.C. players
Liga 1 (Indonesia) players
Association football goalkeepers
Indonesia international footballers
Sportspeople from Central Java